Perošević is a Serbo-Croatian surname. Notable people with the surname include:

 Antonio Perošević (born 1992), Croatian footballer
 Boško Perošević (1956–2000), Serbian politician

Croatian surnames
Serbian surnames